Feretia apodanthera is a species of tree in the family Rubiaceae. It was first described by Delile in  1843.

Description 
It has simple, broad leaves. It grows to approximately 15 feet, and has a self-supporting growth structure. The flowers  grow on short lateral shoots usually appearing before the leaves.

Its range extends from tropical west Africa to the horn of Africa, including: Senegal, Gambia, Mauritania, Mali, Cote D'Ivoire, Burkina Faso, Ghana, Togo, Benin, Nigeria, Niger, Cameroon, Chad, Central African Republic, Uganda, Ethiopia, Eritrea, Somalia,  Tanzania and Kenya.

References 

apodanthera
Octotropideae